The People's Party of the Community of Madrid (PP) is the regional branch of the People's Party in the Community of Madrid, as well as one of the historically most powerful organizations within the PP.

Leaders

Party presidents
Luis Eduardo Cortés Muñoz (1989–1993)
Pío García-Escudero (1993–2004)
Esperanza Aguirre (2004–2016)
Caretaker Committee (2016–2017)

Cristina Cifuentes (2017–2018)
Pío García-Escudero (2018-2022)
Isabel Díaz Ayuso (2022-present)

Presidents of the Community of Madrid
Alberto Ruiz-Gallardón (1995–2003)
Esperanza Aguirre (2003–2012)
Ignacio González (2012–2015)
Cristina Cifuentes (2015–2018)
Ángel Garrido (2018–2019)
Isabel Díaz Ayuso (2019–present)

Electoral performance

Assembly of Madrid

Cortes Generales

European Parliament

Notes

People's Party (Spain)
Political parties in the Community of Madrid